The 2022–23 Elon Phoenix men's basketball team represented Elon University in the 2022–23 NCAA Division I men's basketball season. The Phoenix, led by first-year head coach Billy Taylor, played their home games at the Schar Center in Elon, North Carolina as members of the Colonial Athletic Association.

Previous season
The Phoenix finished the 2021–22 season 10–22, 7–11 in CAA play to finish in seventh place. They were defeated by UNC Wilmington in the quarterfinals of the CAA tournament. On April 5, head coach Mike Schrage announced his resignation after three years at the helm. On April 15, Iowa assistant coach Billy Taylor was announced as Schrage's successor.

Roster

Schedule and results

|-
!colspan=12 style=| Non-conference regular season

|-
!colspan=12 style=| CAA regular season

|-
!colspan=12 style=| CAA tournament

Sources

References

Elon Phoenix men's basketball seasons
Elon Phoenix
Elon Phoenix men's basketball
Elon Phoenix men's basketball